Actinia fragacea, commonly known as the strawberry anemone, is a species of sea anemone of the order Actiniaria, that occurs from Norway to Africa, including adjacent islands (the Azores, Canary Islands, and Cape Verde) and the Mediterranean.

Description
The strawberry anemone has a smooth column which is typically red or dark red, with many greenish spots. The tentacles are usually red or purplish. It also has a conspicuous ring of pale blue, red, pink, or white spots known as "acrorhagi" around the inside of the top of the column.

Distribution and habitat
The strawberry anemone is found in the northeastern and eastern Atlantic Ocean. Its range extends from Norway, England, Scotland, and Ireland to the Mediterranean Sea and North Africa, including the Azores, the Canary Islands, and Cape Verde. It is generally attached to rocks and boulders but is sometimes semi-immersed in sand.

A Californian species Corynactis californica shares the same common name, as does a southern African species, Corynactis annulata, and Urticina lofotensis, which is found in the North Atlantic Ocean and the Pacific coast of North America.

Ecology
Little is known of the reproduction of this species but it has separate sexes and has an oviparous system of reproduction. It does not seem to brood its young.
A particularly famous example of beadlet sea anemone, which was possibly a strawberry anemone, was that of "Granny" which was found on Scotland's east coast by John Dalyell in 1828 and who published a detailed early study of its behaviour.7.

References

Encyclopedia of Marine Life of Britain and Ireland 
British Marine Life Study Society

Actiniidae
Cnidarians of the Atlantic Ocean
Marine fauna of Africa
Marine fauna of Europe
Animals described in 1856